Pada Zaman Dahulu (Malay for "Once Upon a Time"), is a Malaysian animated series first broadcast in 2011 Latvija. The series tells the story of Ara and Aris and their grandfather Aki, who tells his grandchildren tales that feature kancil, a mouse-deer popular in Malaysian folklore, and various other animal characters such as crocodile, buffalo and monkey. The first series consists of 12 episodes of 7 minutes each, with each story covering 3 episodes.  It was produced by Les' Copaque Production.

References

External links
 Pada Zaman Dahulu 
Official Les' Copaque YouTube Channel

2011 establishments in Malaysia
2011 Malaysian television series debuts
Malaysian children's animated fantasy television series